Ashley Creek is a  tributary of the Sauk River in central Minnesota, United States, joining the Sauk just north of Sauk Centre. It is part of the Mississippi River watershed.

Ashley Creek was named in the 1850s for Ossian Doolittle Ashley, a Boston stockbroker.

See also
List of rivers of Minnesota

References

Minnesota Watersheds
USGS Hydrologic Unit Map - State of Minnesota (1974)

Rivers of Minnesota
Rivers of Stearns County, Minnesota
Tributaries of the Mississippi River